Marietta Millner (1894 – June 26, 1929) was an Austrian film actress of the silent era.

Personal life
Millner married a businessman from Klagenfurt.

Millner died from tuberculosis on June 26, 1929, in Baden bei Wien. Her death was attributed to "extreme dieting".

Selected filmography
 Das Spielzeug von Paris (1925)
 Sons in Law (1926)
 The City Gone Wild (1927)
 The Hunt for the Bride (1927)
 We're All Gamblers (1927)
 The Island of Forbidden Kisses (1927)
 Drums of the Desert (1927)
 Nameless Woman (1927)
 Intoxicated Love (1927)
 Modern Pirates (1928)
 The Magnificent Flirt (1928)
 The Model from Montparnasse (1929)
 The Tsarevich (1929)

References

Bibliography
 Wendy Warwick White. Ford Sterling: The Life and Films. McFarland, 2007.

External links

1894 births
1929 deaths
Austrian film actresses
Austrian silent film actresses
20th-century Austrian actresses
Actors from Linz
Deaths from tuberculosis in Austria-Hungary